Claude de Visdelou (12 August 1656 – 11 November 1737) was a French Jesuit missionary.

Life
De Visdelou was born at the Château de Bienassis, Erquy, Brittany.  He entered the Society of Jesus on 5 September 1673, and was one of the missionaries sent to China by Louis XIV in 1687. He acquired a wide knowledge of the Chinese language and literature. Other learned Jesuits considered that he gave too much credit to contemporary Chinese commentators, who had their own interpretations on the works of the ancient Chinese sages.

When the papal legate Mgr. de Tournon came to China in 1705, chiefly to regulate the question of the Chinese Rites, Visdelou was the only Jesuit favourable to their prohibition. Tournon appointed him Vicar Apostolic of Kwei-chou with the title of bishop of Claudiopolis in Isauria, but his superiors opposed the nomination, since Visdelou had not received papal dispensation from his vow not to accept ecclesiastical dignity.

With the missionaries who had submitted to the decree against the rites, Visdelou followed the legate to Macau, where he was secretly consecrated bishop, 2 February 1709. He then set out for Pondicherry where he arrived, 25 June 1709; he remained there in great retirement in the house of the French Capuchins until his death at Pondicherry.

Works

Visdelou took with him over 500 volumes in Chinese and almost his sole occupation consisted in working on these. He sent to Rome several writings on the questions of the rites. The sinologist James Legge, says he "was in the habit of writing extravagantly about the Chinese and caricaturing their sentiments" ("Notions of the Chinese concerning God and the spirit", Hong Kong, 1852, 10). Some of his cited work deal with the history of the Tartars. He collected from Chinese historians unique documents on the peoples of Central Asia and Eastern Asia: Huns, Tatars, Mongols, and Turks.

His researches on this subject were first published as supplement to Herbelot's Bibliothèque orientale (1779). However, they must have assisted Joseph de Guignes in his history of the Huns, for the geographer Anville who had handled all Visdelou's valuable manuscript on the Tatars tells us that the author had sent them to the Academician Jean-Roland Malet, who died in 1736 (Memoire de M. d'Anville sur la Chine, 1776, 33).

Notes

Norbert, Oraison funebre de N. de Visdelou, Jesuite, evêque de Claudiopolis, Vicaire Apostolique en Chine et aux Indes, etc. in Memoires historiques ... sur les missiones orientales, III (Lucca, 1745), 343–460
Augustin de Backer – Carlos Sommervogel, Bibliothèque, VIII, 838-43.

External links
Source

1656 births
1737 deaths
17th-century French Jesuits
Roman Catholic missionaries in China
French Roman Catholic missionaries
18th-century French Jesuits
People from Côtes-d'Armor
Jesuit missionaries
French expatriates in China